FCS may refer to:

Education 
 Faith Christian School (disambiguation)
 Faujdarhat Collegiate School, in Chittagong, Bangladesh
 Florence Christian School in South Carolina, United States
 Florida College System, in the United States
 Foothills Christian Schools, in San Diego County, California, United States
 Forsyth County Schools in Georgia, United States
 Franklin College Switzerland, an American college in Switzerland
 Friendship Christian School (disambiguation)
 Friends' Central School, in Pennsylvania, United States

Sports 
 Football Championship Subdivision, an American football classification in the NCAA in the United States for college football
 Fox College Sports, an American television sport network

Association football clubs 
 1. FC Saarbrücken, in Germany
 FC Red Bull Salzburg, in Austria
 FC Schaffhausen, in Switzerland
 1. FC Schweinfurt 05, in Germany
 1. FC Slovácko, in the Czech Republic
 FC South End, in Trinidad and Tobago
 FC Strausberg, in Germany
 F.C. Südtirol, in Italy

Technology
 Fairchild Semiconductor, an American semiconductor company
 FCS Control Systems, a Dutch aerospace company
 Fibre Channel switch
 Fighter catapult ship
 Fin control system
 Final Cut Studio
 Fire-control system
 Flight control system
 Flight control surfaces
 Flow Cytometry Standard
 Fluorescence correlation spectroscopy
 Frame check sequence, communication error detection
 Fusion Camera System
 Future Combat Systems

Other uses
 Chalmers Naval Architecture Students' Society
 Family and consumer science
 Federation of Conservative Students, a former student wing of the British Conservative Party
 Fellow of the Chemical Society (postnomial)
 Ferrocarril del Sur (English: Peru Southern Railway), a former peruvian railway company
 Fetal calf serum
 Foreign Commercial Service of the United States Department of Commerce
 Fraser Commando School, an Australian training facility
 The "favourable conservation status" of protected habitats and species in the European Union's Habitats Directive
 First customer shipment (ship, shipping), the stage in hardware or software development process when a certain product or a version thereof is provided to the customers for the first time

See also 
 FC (disambiguation)